Come To Papa is a blues album by Carl Weathersby. It was released in 2000 on the Evidence Records. It was produced by John Snyder and recorded December 18–21, 1999 at Sounds Unreel in Memphis, Tennessee.

Track listing 
01. "Come To Papa" (Willie Mitchell/Earl Randle) - 4:36
02. "Leap Of Faith" (Gary Nicholson/Glen Clark) - 4:03
03. "Love, Lead Us Home" (Tommy Malone/Pat McLaughlin/Johnny Ray Allen/Kenneth Blevins) - 5:03
04. "You Better Think About It" (Rico McFarland) - 5:05
05. "(I Feel Like) Breakin' Up Somebody's Home" (Al Jackson, Jr./Timothy Matthews) - 4:39
06. "Walking The Back Streets And Cryin'" (Sandy Jones) - 6:56
07. "My Baby" (Carl Weathersby) - 4:56
08. "Floodin' In California" (Albert King) - 3:48
09. "A Good Man Is Hard To Find" (Steven Washington Lucky Peterson) - 4:41
10. "Help Me Somebody" (Jon Cleary) - 5:46
11. "Danger All About" (Carl Weathersby) - 4:37
12. "Drifting Blues" (Johnny Moore/Edward Williams/Charles Brown) - 7:28

Personnel
 Carl Weathersby - vocals, guitar
 Lucky Peterson - Hammond B-3 organ, Wurlitzer piano, clavinet
 Rico McFarland - rhythm guitar
 Willie Weeks - bass
 Steve Potts - drums
 The Memphis Horns (Wayne Jackson & Andrew Love) - horns
 Ann Peebles - vocal on "Come To Papa"
 John Carlyle - background vocal on "My Baby"
 Harold Chandler - background vocal on "My Baby"

References

2000 albums
Carl Weathersby albums
Evidence Music albums